Green Bay is a suburb of West Auckland. It is under the local governance of the Auckland Council. The main road running through Green Bay is Godley Road and this is the Urban Route 15 that follows through Green Bay to Titirangi and Laingholm.

Green Bay beach is part of the Karaka Park coastal walk. In pre-European times, the beach was the southern end of Te Toanga Waka, the Whau River portage connecting the Waitematā and Manukau harbours. At the west end of the beach there was a large Māori pā at Motukaraka (which is today Karaka Park). The area was originally called Karaka Bay, but was renamed to the current name to avoid confusion with other bays named Karaka.

Demographics

Green Bay had a population of 4,788 at the 2018 New Zealand census, an increase of 192 people (4.2%) since the 2013 census, and an increase of 438 people (10.1%) since the 2006 census. There were 1,833 households, comprising 2,253 males and 2,535 females, giving a sex ratio of 0.89 males per female, with 879 people (18.4%) aged under 15 years, 687 (14.3%) aged 15 to 29, 2,028 (42.4%) aged 30 to 64, and 1,194 (24.9%) aged 65 or older.

Ethnicities were 74.9% European/Pākehā, 8.1% Māori, 7.5% Pacific peoples, 19.0% Asian, and 2.8% other ethnicities. People may identify with more than one ethnicity.

The percentage of people born overseas was 31.9, compared with 27.1% nationally.

Although some people chose not to answer the census's question about religious affiliation, 47.0% had no religion, 37.8% were Christian, 0.4% had Māori religious beliefs, 4.1% were Hindu, 2.0% were Muslim, 0.7% were Buddhist and 2.1% had other religions.

Of those at least 15 years old, 984 (25.2%) people had a bachelor's or higher degree, and 672 (17.2%) people had no formal qualifications. 744 people (19.0%) earned over $70,000 compared to 17.2% nationally. The employment status of those at least 15 was that 1,794 (45.9%) people were employed full-time, 492 (12.6%) were part-time, and 99 (2.5%) were unemployed.

Education
It opened in 1973.

It opened in 1960, and covered years 1-6 until an intermediate department was added in 1997.

Both schools are coeducational, and situated next to each other on Godley Road.

References

External links
 Photographs of Green Bay held in Auckland Libraries' heritage collections.

Suburbs of Auckland
Whau Local Board Area
Populated places around the Manukau Harbour
Bays of the Auckland Region
West Auckland, New Zealand